Coleophora meridionella is a moth of the family Coleophoridae. It is found from Austria to Italy and from France to Greece.

The larvae feed on Silene saxifraga and Silene vulgaris. They create a trivalved, spindle-shaped, tubular silken case of 11.5–13 mm and a mouth angle of about 30°. The case has length lines of attached sand grains. Larvae can be found from May to June.

References

meridionella
Moths described in 1912
Moths of Europe